Bengt Nilsson may refer to:

 Bengt Nilsson (actor) (born 1967), Swedish actor
 Bengt Nilsson (athlete) (1934–2018), Swedish former athlete
 Bengt Nilsson (rower) (born 1954), Swedish Olympic rower